SM U-57 was one of the 329 submarines serving in the Imperial German Navy in World War I.
U-57 was engaged in naval warfare and took part in the First Battle of the Atlantic.

Summary of raiding history

References

Notes

Citations

Bibliography

World War I submarines of Germany
1916 ships
U-boats commissioned in 1916
Ships built in Bremen (state)
Type U 57 submarines